"Me Gustas Tal Como Eres" (Spanish for "I like you just the way you are") is a song written by Juan Carlos Calderón and Luis Gómez Escolar, produced by Calderón, and performed by Scottish singer Sheena Easton in a duet with Mexican singer Luis Miguel. The track was released by EMI Music as the first single from her first Spanish language album Todo Me Recuerda a Ti (1984). The song earned the Grammy Award for Best Mexican/Mexican-American Performance at the 27th Grammy Awards, being the second time that this award was handed out. Easton and Miguel's winning resulted in controversy with Mexican-American musicians, and a protest ensued. The award became the second Grammy for Easton, after being recognized as the Best New Artist in 1981, and the first for Miguel. The song was later included on Miguel's studio album Palabra de Honor (1984).

References

1980s ballads
1984 singles
Sheena Easton songs
Luis Miguel songs
Male–female vocal duets
Spanish-language songs
Songs written by Juan Carlos Calderón
Songs written by Luis Gómez Escolar
Song recordings produced by Juan Carlos Calderón
Grammy Award for Best Mexican/Mexican-American Album
EMI Records singles
Pop ballads
1984 songs